This list includes all lakes, both intermittent and perennial. It is complete with respect to the 1996 Gazetteer of Australia. Dubious names have been checked against the online 2004 data, and in all cases confirmed correct. However, if any lakes have been gazetted or deleted since 1996, this list does not reflect these changes. Strictly speaking, Australian place names are gazetted in capital letters only; the names in this list have been converted to mixed case in accordance with normal capitalisation conventions. Locations are as gazetted; some lakes may extend over large areas.



Q

R

S

T

U

V

W

Y

See also 

 List of lakes in Western Australia

References

Further reading
 Streetsmart Travellers Atlas of Western Australia  (2006)  Department of Land Information and West Australian Newspapers,9th ed. 
In the state Maps - they can be identified, and are listed in the Geographical Features Index p. 289
Quality Publishing Australia.(2007) Roads & tracks Western Australia : campsites directory, roads and tracks, all in one  Jolimont, W.A., Quality Publishing Australia, 5th ed   
Has a Geographical index p. 277
 UBD Western Australia country road atlas (2005) Macquarie Park, N.S.W.UBD, a division of Universal Publishers,  11th ed  
Identifies in maps but has no accompanying index

List, Q-Z
Lakes, Q-Z
Western Australia, Q-Z
Lists of coordinates